An annular solar eclipse occurred on  March 7, 1951, with a magnitude of 0.9896. A solar eclipse occurs when the Moon passes between Earth and the Sun, thereby totally or partly obscuring the image of the Sun for a viewer on Earth. An annular solar eclipse occurs when the Moon's apparent diameter is smaller than the Sun's, blocking most of the Sun's light and causing the Sun to look like an annulus (ring). An annular eclipse appears as a partial eclipse over a region of the Earth thousands of kilometres wide. Annularity was visible from New Zealand on March 8 (Thursday), and northern Costa Rica, Nicaragua, and San Andrés Island in Colombia on March 7 (Wednesday).

Broadcast 
This was the first solar eclipse in the world broadcast live on television. American stations such as WCBS-TV, WNET, and NBC News broadcast it live. The path of annularity did not pass the United States of America, and only a partial solar eclipse was visible from the southeastern half of the country. For example, in New York City, a partial solar eclipse occurred right before the sunset, whose gratitude (ratio of diameter covered by the moon) was only 17%, meaning only 8% of the total disk area was covered at the peak of the eclipse. The curator of the Hayden Planetarium in New York also asked "don’t get people too excited about it" in an interview with The New York Times, but many TV stations still incorporated the solar eclipse into their regular afternoon schedule and also some new TV technology was inaugurated.

Related eclipses

Solar eclipses of 1950–1953

Saros 129

Metonic series

Notes

References

1951 3 7
1951 in science
1951 3 7
March 1951 events